This is a list of notable Old Wellingtonians, being former pupils of Wellington College in Berkshire, England.

Politics
David Blomfield MBE (1934–2016), leader of the Liberal Party group on Richmond upon Thames Council, writer, book editor and local historian
Hammad Azhar (1982-), Member of National Assembly of Pakistan, Federal Minister. 
Sir Edmund Stockdale (1903–1989), Lord Mayor of London 
Michael Blundell (1907–1993), politician and government minister in Kenya
Crispin Blunt (1960–), Conservative Member of Parliament for the English constituency of Reigate since 1997, and chair of the Foreign Affairs Select Committee.
Julian Brazier, TD (1953–), Conservative Member of Parliament for the English constituency of Canterbury from 1987 to 2017 and former government minister
Lord Campbell of Croy (1921–2005), British Cabinet Minister who served as Secretary of State for Scotland during the whole of Edward Heath's government
Lord Colnbrook (1922–1996), British Cabinet Minister
John Dugdale (1905–1963), journalist, Labour Member of Parliament for the English constituency of West Bromwich between 1941 and 1962, and former government minister
James Malcolm Monteith Erskine (1863–1944), Anti-Waste League, Independent Conservative, and Conservative Member of Parliament for Westminster St George's, 1921–1929
Christopher Ewart-Biggs (1921–1976), British Ambassador who was assassinated by the IRA
The Viscount Falkland (1935–), Liberal Democrat politician and one of the 92 remaining hereditary peers elected to sit in the Lords
George Ferguson (1947–), the first elected Mayor of Bristol (2012–16)
Thomas Galbraith, 2nd Baron Strathclyde (1960–), Former leader of the Conservative Party in the House of Lords
Sir Edward Garnier QC (1952–), Conservative Member of Parliament for the English constituency of Harborough since 1992, and former Solicitor General for England and Wales
Lord Gordon-Walker (1907–1980), British Cabinet Minister who served as Foreign Secretary under Harold Wilson
 The Lord Faulks QC (1950–), Conservative Member in the House of Lords
Sir Alexander Grantham, (1899–1978) British colonial administrator who governed Hong Kong
Lord Luce (1936–) Governor of Gibraltar and Lord Chamberlain to HM The Queen
Antony Rivers Marlow (1940–), Conservative Member of Parliament for the English constituency of Northampton North between 1979 and 1997
Sir Harold Nicolson (1886–1968), British diplomat, author and politician
Sir Michael Spicer (1943–), Conservative Member of Parliament for the English constituencies of West Worcestershire and South Worcestershire between 1974–2010 and former chairman of the 1922 committee
Edward Stanley, 17th Earl of Derby (1865–1948), British Secretary of State for War (two separate times) and founder of the Lord Derby Cup
Lord Stodart of Leaston (1916–2003), Scottish Tory politician who served under Sir Alec Douglas-Home and Edward Heath
 Robin Tilbrook (1958–), leader and founder of the English Democrats

Religion
The Lord Harries of Pentregarth (1936–) retired Church of England bishop, the 41st Bishop of Oxford from 1987 to 2006
 David Watson (1933–1984) evangelical Church of England clergyman, evangelist and author

Sport
Lionel Booth (1850–1912), cricketer
Frederick Browning (1870–1929) cricketer and rackets amateur champion
Simon Clarke (1938–2017) England rugby player and first-class cricketer
Ben Curran (1996-) Northamptonshire Cricketer, brother of Tom and Sam
Sam Curran (1998–) England and Surrey Cricketer, brother of Tom Curran
Thomas Curran (1995–) England and Surrey Cricketer, brother of Sam Curran
Ernest Denny (1872–1949), cricketer
Paul Doran-Jones (1985–) England International Rugby player
Sean Edwards (1986–2013) British racing driver
Max Evans (1983–) Scotland International Rugby player
Thom Evans (1985–) Scotland International Rugby player
David Fasken (1932–2006), First-class cricketer
James Haskell (1985–) England International Rugby player
Sir Patrick Head (1946–) co-founder of the Williams Formula One team
Percy Heath (1877–1917), cricketer
Madison Hughes (1992–) USA International Rugby player
James Hunt (1947–1993) 1976 F1 World Champion
Norman Grace (1894–1975), cricketer
Peter Gracey (1921–2006), cricketer
Max Lahiff (1989–) Rugby union player (Bath Rugby & London Irish)
Morgan Lake (1997–) Olympic athlete and twice World Junior Athletics Champion
Henry Arnold Lawrence (1848–1902) England International Rugby player and captain
Rear-Admiral Spencer Login, C.V.O., Royal Navy (1851-1909), rugby union international who represented England in 1875
Tim Mayer (1966–) US motorsports organizer and official.
Richard Raphael (1872–1910), cricketer
Donald Ray (1903–1944), cricketer
Jamie Salmon (1959–) dual rugby international (New Zealand All Blacks and England)
James Scott Douglas (1930–1969) Scottish racing driver (and Baronet Douglas)
Ernest Tomkins (1869–1927), cricketer
Tom Townsend (1971–) Britain and England international bridge player and writer
Chris Wakefield (1991–), cricketer
Geoffrey Warren (1908–1941), cricketer
Louis Weigall (1873-1957), cricketer
Maximillian Wood  (1873–1915), cricketer
Richard Worsley (1879–1917), cricketer
Murray Wyatt Marshall (1873–1978), England International Rugby player and captain
Ed Young (1989–), cricketer
Peter Young (1986–), cricketer

Art and entertainment
Charles Robert Ashbee (1863–1942) one of the prime movers of the English Arts and Crafts movement
Ellie Bamber (1997–) actress
Sir Hugh Beaver (1890–1967) founder of the Guinness Book of Records
James Bernard (1925–2001) British Film composer and Academy Award winner
Trevor Blakemore (1879–1953), poet
Josh Bowman (1988–) Star of ABC drama Revenge
Rory Bremner (1961–) British impressionist and comedian, noted for his political satire
Heather Cameron-Hayes, Semi-Finalist of BBC1's The Voice 2016 
Bob Carlos Clarke (1950–2006) Photographer
Richard Curle (1883–1968), author, critic and journalist
Henry Danton (1919–2022) ballet dancer Henry Danton
Caggie Dunlop, Star of E4 reality series Made in Chelsea
Elize du Toit (1980–) actress and model best known for the Channel 4 soap opera Hollyoaks
Gavin Ewart (1916–1995) British poet
Jim Field Smith (1979–) British film director, writer and comedian
Sebastian Faulks (1953–) novelist whose works include Birdsong and Charlotte Gray
Nicola Formby (1965– ), journalist
John Gardner (1917–2011) British composer
John Keane (1954–) painter and official artist, Gulf War
Sir Christopher Lee (1922–2015) film actor
John Masters (1914–1983) British Army Officer and novelist
Robert Morley (1908–1992) film actor
John Nash (1893–1977) 20th-century painter and war artist
Frederick Noad (1929–2001) guitarist, lutenist, author, and teacher
Gregory Norminton (1976–) novelist
George Orwell (1903–1950) author of Animal Farm and Nineteen Eighty-Four (Easter Term 1917 only, in May 1917 he became a King's Scholar at Eton)
Nerina Pallot (1974–) singer, songwriter, producer
Harry Ricketts (1950–) writer and biographer
Guy Siner (1947–) actor
Count Nikolai Tolstoy (1935–) Russo-British historian and author
Martin Windrow (1944–) British historian
Will Young (1979–) British singer and actor

Broadcasting
Daniel Farson (1927–1997) broadcaster and writer
Gerald Hine-Haycock (1951–) journalist, Correspondent for ITN and BBC News; Presenter for HTV West and BBC West
Robin Oakley (1941–) journalist, Political Editor of CNN International, formerly Political Editor of the BBC
Peter Snow CBE (1938–) British television and radio presenter

Military
Field Marshal Sir Claude Auchinleck, British Army commander during World War II
Field Marshal Sir Nigel Bagnall, Chief of the General Staff
Marshal of the Royal Air Force Sir John Salmond, Chief of the Air Staff
Field Marshal Sir Geoffrey Baker, Chief of the General Staff 1968 to 1971
Field Marshal Sir Gerald Templer, Chief of the Imperial General Staff
General Sir Harry Tuzo, General Officer Commanding, Northern Ireland and other senior British Army commands
General Sir Charles Huxtable, Commander-in-Chief UK Land Forces 1988 to 1990
General Sir Richard O'Connor, British Army general during World War II
General Sir Peter Hunt, Chief of the General Staff 1973
General Sir James Glover, Commander-in-Chief UK Land Forces 1985 to 1987
General Sir Roland Guy, Adjutant General to the British Army 1984 to 1986
 General Sir Chris Deverell, Commander of the UK's Joint Forces Command and member of the UK Chiefs of Staff Committee April 2016 to May 2019.
Lieutenant General Sir Noel Beresford-Peirse, General Officer Commanding, XIII Corps and later General Officer Commander-in-Chief, Southern Army, India during the Second World War
Lieutenant General Sir Alistair Irwin, Adjutant General to the British Army 2003 to 2005
Lieutenant General Sir Montagu Stopford, Commander of British forces during the Battle of Kohima
Lieutenant General Sir Maurice Johnston, Assistant Chief of the General Staff, Deputy Chief of the Defence Staff and Lord Lieutenant of Wiltshire
Lieutenant General Sir Kenneth Loch, Director of Anti-Aircraft and Coastal Defence (1939–1941), Master-General of Ordnance, India (1944–1947), and head of the board of governors at Wellington
Major-General George Erroll Prior-Palmer, General Officer Commanding, 6th Armoured Division
Major-General Douglas Wimberley, British Divisional Commander in World War II
Roger Bushell, Mastermind of the Great Escape
Lieutenant Colonel Sir Wolseley Haig (1865–1938) Lieutenant-Colonel 
Sir John Rennie, former Director of the Secret Intelligence Service (MI6)

Victoria Cross and George Cross holders
Fifteen Old Wellingtonians have won the Victoria Cross; one Old Wellingtonian has won the George Cross. They are as follows:

Victoria Cross
Zulu War
Lieutenant Henry Lysons, VC (He later achieved the rank of colonel and was made a Companion of the Order of the Bath (CB)) (1858–1907)
South African War (Boer War)
Captain Charles FitzClarence, VC (He later achieved the rank of brigadier general.  He was killed in action, Polygon Wood, Zonnebeke, Belgium, on 12 November 1914) (1865–1914)
Captain Ernest Beachcroft Beckwith Towse, VC (He later became a Knight Commander of the Royal Victorian Order (KCVO), and a Commander of the Order of the British Empire CBE) (1864–1948)
Third Ashanti Expedition
Captain Charles John Melliss, VC (later to become Major General Sir Charles John Melliss VC, KCB, KCMG) (1862–1936)
Second Somaliland Expedition
Captain Alexander Stanhope Cobbe VC, (He later achieved the rank of general) (1870–1931)
First World War
Captain John Franks Vallentin, VC (1882–1914)
Lieutenant James Anson Otho Brooke VC (1884–1914)
Captain John Fitzhardinge Paul Butler VC (1888–1916)
Second Lieutenant Alexander Buller Turner, VC (1893–1915)
Lieutenant Thomas Orde Lawder Wilkinson, VC (1894–1916)
Second World War
Flight Lieutenant Roderick Alastair Brook Learoyd, VC (1913–1996)
Commander Anthony Cecil Capel Miers, VC (Later to become Rear Admiral Sir Anthony Cecil Capel Miers VC, KBE, CB, DSO & Bar) (1906–1985)
Captain Patrick Porteous, VC (1918–2000) (he later achieved the rank of colonel)
Lieutenant-Colonel Victor Buller Turner, VC (brother of Alexander Buller Turner, VC)(1900–1972)
Lieutenant Claud Raymond, VC (1923–1945)
George Cross
1935 Quetta earthquake
Lieutenant John Cowley GC (Originally awarded the Albert Medal which was converted to the George Cross. He was later to become Lieutenant General Sir John Cowley GC KBE CB)

Other
Joseph Arthur Arkwright FRS Bacteriologist
John Arnold
David Boyle, British intelligence officer
Ranald Boyle, British diplomat 
C.R. Boxer, historian
Matthew Restall, historian
W S Bristowe, arachnologist
Michael Brock CBE, British historian
Patrick de Maré, psychiatrist
Alexander Mountbatten, 1st Marquess of Carisbrooke
Michael Knatchbull, 5th Baron Brabourne, British peer and soldier
The Marquess of Cambridge, brother of Queen Mary
Anthony Fletcher, English historian
Nicholas Grimshaw, English architect who is behind the Eden Project
Prince Christian Victor of Schleswig-Holstein
The 9th Duke of Portland
Prince Francis of Teck
John F. C. Turner, architect and theorist
Peter Llewellyn Gwynn-Jones, Garter Principal King of Arms, 1995–2010
Professor Klaus Dodds, Notable Academic and Professor of Geopolitics. Royal Holloway, University of London
John Haycraft, founder of International House World Organisation
Sir Rudolph Peters FRS, biochemist
Princess Maria Olympia of Greece and Denmark, daughter of Pavlos, Crown Prince of Greece and granddaughter of King Constantine II

See also
 :Category:People educated at Wellington College, Berkshire

References

 
Lists of people by English school affiliation
Berkshire-related lists